This page lists the World Best Year Performance in the year 2003 in the men's decathlon. One of the main events during this season were the 2003 World Championships in Paris, France, where the competition started on Monday, August 26, 2003 and ended on Tuesday, August 27, 2003.

Records

2003 World Year Ranking

See also
2003 Hypo-Meeting

References
decathlon2000
IAAF
apulanta
IAAF Year Ranking

2003
Decathlon Year Ranking, 2003